The Protectionist Majority Party of the Upper House was a political party in Sweden, founded in 1888. It was a conservative and protectionist party. Two politicians from this party, Gustaf Åkerhielm and Christian Lundeberg, served as Prime Minister of Sweden. In 1912 the Protectionist Party became part of the National Party.

Political parties established in 1902
Defunct political parties in Sweden
Defunct conservative parties
Conservative parties in Sweden
Protectionism
1902 establishments in Sweden